Andreas Deja is a Polish-born German-American character animator, most noted for his work at Walt Disney Animation Studios. Deja's work includes serving as supervising animator on characters in several Disney animated films, including the Disney villains Gaston in Beauty and the Beast, Jafar in Aladdin, and Scar in The Lion King, the titular character in Hercules, and Lilo Pelekai in Lilo & Stitch.

Early life
Deja was born in Poland, but moved with his family to Germany. He credits seeing Disney's The Jungle Book as an 11-year-old with inspiring him to become an animator. At that young age, he promptly wrote to Walt Disney Productions to express his interest in working there, and received back a form letter which he has kept ever since. Deja later summarized the letter and how he acted on it as follows: "Please, do not send us any copies of Mickey Mouse. We can teach you that. You need to become an artist in your own right first. Watch the world around you. Draw your brothers and sisters. Go to the zoo. Sketch the animals a lot ... I took it very seriously ... I knew I had to be good. I knew I had to be above average."

After graduating from Theodor-Heuss Gymnasium (secondary school), he studied graphic design at the Folkwang Hochschule in Essen, Germany.

Career

A lifelong fan of Disney animated films, Deja was hired by the studio in August 1980 after he had corresponded with Eric Larson, one of Disney's senior Nine Old Men of animation who ran the studio's training department. The first film on which he worked for was The Black Cauldron, during which time he shared a cubicle with future film director Tim Burton.

During his rookie days at Disney, Deja sought mentorship and practical advice from seven of the then-living Nine Old Men, who were already retired before his tenure. Deja has collected information on the Nine Old Men over the years, and has stated that one of his ambitions is to publish one book for each of the Nine Old Men.

Deja is best known as the supervising animator of some of the most memorable Disney villains: Gaston in Beauty and the Beast, Jafar in Aladdin, Scar in The Lion King and Queen Narissa in Enchanted. He also animated Roger Rabbit in Who Framed Roger Rabbit, King Triton in The Little Mermaid, the title character in Hercules, Lilo Pelekai in Lilo & Stitch, Mama Odie in The Princess and the Frog and Tigger in Winnie the Pooh. In addition, he is the current resident specialist for the animation of Mickey Mouse.

In 2011, he began a blog where he shares some of his collection of the work of the early Disney animators.

In 2015, Deja authored The Nine Old Men: Lessons, Techniques, and Inspiration from Disney's Great Animators  published by Focal Press.

As of June 2022, he is currently working on the animated film Mushka.

Deja was the guest curator for the exhibition titled Walt Disney’s The Jungle Book: Making a Masterpiece which took place at The Walt Disney Family Museum from June 23, 2022 to January 8, 2023 to celebrate the film's 55th anniversary.  A Members Only Preview of the exhibition which included a special talk with Deja, Darleen Carr, Floyd Norman and Bruce Reitherman took place on June 22, 2022. Deja also wrote an extensive companion book for the exhibition which was originally slated to be published by Weldon Owen on September 20, 2022, before it was changed to November 1, 2022.

Personal life
Deja is openly gay. His sexuality has been discussed as an influence on the development of some Disney characters.

Filmography

Awards
In 2006, at the 34th Annie Awards, Deja was awarded the Winsor McCay Award for outstanding contribution to the art of animation.
At the 2015 D23 Expo, he was honored as a Disney Legend.

References

External links

Deja View, Andreas Deja's blog
IGN Interview with Deja (2003)
Animated News Interview with Deja (2005)
Interview with Deja, DVD Movie Guide (2003)

Living people
American animators
German emigrants to the United States
Walt Disney Animation Studios people
American gay artists
LGBT animators
LGBT film directors
Polish gay artists
Folkwang University of the Arts alumni
Annie Award winners
Year of birth missing (living people)